Royal Plaza, Royal Square, or similar may refer to:

Public places
Plaça Reial, Barcelona, Catalonia, Spain
Place des Vosges, Paris, France, originally Place Royale
Place Royale, Brussels, Belgium
Place Royale, Reims, France
Place Royal, Quebec City, Quebec, Canada
Royal Plaza (Bangkok), Thailand
Royal Square of Esfahan, Iran, now Naqsh-e Jahan Square

Hotels
Royal Plaza Hotel (Florida), U.S., now B Resort & Spa
Royal Plaza Hotel (Hong Kong)
Royal Plaza Hotel (Nakhon Ratchasima), Thailand, which collapsed in 1993
Royal Plaza on Scotts, a hotel in Singapore

Other uses
Royal Plaza (Surabaya), East Java, Indonesia, a shopping mall
Place du Royaume, a shopping centre in Saguenay, Quebec, Canada

See also

Queen Square (disambiguation)
King's Square (disambiguation)